Uti possidetis is an expression that originated in Roman private law, where it was the name of a procedure used in litigation about land.  It came from a praetorial edict that could be abbreviated  "As you possess, so shall you possess".  Later, by a misleading analogy, the phrase was transferred to international law, where it has had more than one meaning.

In Rome, if two parties disputed possession of land, the praetor preferred the one who was in actual occupation, unless he had got it from the other by force, stealth or as a temporary favour.  The contest was initiated by an interdict called .  The winner was confirmed or restored in possession, and the loser was ordered not to displace him by force.  However, the winner had not proved he was the real owner; only that, for the moment, he had a better right to possession than his opponent.

In the early modern era some European states, when dealing with other European states, used the phrase to justify the acquisition of territory by occupation. There was no universally agreed rule and, for example, Portugal applied it more ambitiously than Spain.  Despite that, there is no doubt that important polities, such as Brazil, have been established on that interpretation.  It was also a generally accepted rule about the interpretation of peace treaties.  A peace treaty was presumed to give each party a permanent right to the territory it occupied at the conclusion of hostilities, unless the contrary was expressly stipulated.  Whether this rule has survived in the international regime following the creation of the United Nations must be doubtful.  This usage is sometimes called uti possidetis de facto.

In recent times uti possidetis refers to a doctrine for drawing international boundaries.  When colonial territories achieve independence, or when a polity breaks up e.g. Yugoslavia, then, in default of a better rule, the old administrative boundaries between the new states ought to be followed.  This doctrine, which has its critics, is sometimes called .

Roman law

Introduction
A landowner had a theoretically simple way to recover his property: a traditional action called .  All he had to do was to prove he was the owner and the defendant was in possession.  However, in reality proof of ownership could be exceedingly difficult for lack of documentation since, during the formative period of Roman law, there was no system of written conveyancing and registration of land.

Accordingly, in litigation about land each party tried to manoeuvre a situation where the burden of proof was cast on his opponent, and he merely had to defend.  To achieve this they went outside the traditional Roman actions and used a praetorial remedy.

Praetorial remedies
Already in the Roman republic the praetor was an official whose duties included the keeping of the peace.  A praetor held office for a year, at the start of which it was customary for him to publish edicts; these announced the legal policies he intended to apply.  Usually they were adopted with or without modification by his successors.  With these edicts praetors could change the law, though they did it somewhat cautiously.

An interdict was a praetorial order forbidding someone to do something.  The one relevant for present purposes was the interdictum uti possidetis.  It seems this interdict was available by about 169 B.C. because there is a joke about it in one of Terence's comedies, though we do not know the praetor's original wording. Probably it originated as a means of protecting occupants of public lands, since these people could not sue as owners.  Later, however, it was adapted as a procedural device to assign disputants to the role of plaintiff and defendant, respectively.

The interdict uti possidetis
According to the Roman jurist Gaius (Institutes, Fourth Commentary):-

*The vindication was the name of the traditional action for claiming ownership of land, as already explained.

A person could establish possession by occupying the property himself, or through another e.g. his inquilinus (house tenant) or colonus (agricultural tenant).

The three exceptions: nec vi nec clam nec precario
That the praetor would confirm the party in possession was only a default rule, since there were three exceptions:
Vi (force).  If the possessing party had got it from the other by force he was not entitled to the benefit of the interdict. Otherwise it would reward the getting of land by violence.
Clam (stealth).  Likewise if his possession had been obtained furtively; and for a similar reason.
 Precario.  A precario was a person who was in possession only by favour, and could be asked to leave at any time.  (Hence the English word precarious.)

If any of those exceptions applied his possession was flawed (possessio vitiosa) and did not count.

Third parties
If he had got his possession from a third party, though, it did not matter that he had done it illegitimately, i.e. it was of no present relevance.  This is made explicitly clear by Justinian's Institutes, IV, XV §5:   Presumably, whether to complain to the praetor about it was up to the third party.

This was significant when early modern European powers sought to apply the uti possidetis concept to their colonial acquisitions (see below).  Thus, that they had vanquished the indigenous inhabitants by force was of no present consequence if a dispute was between rival Europeans.

Procedure

On the first appearance in court the praetor, whose time was valuable, did not try to investigate the facts.  He simply pronounced the interdict impartially against both parties.  (Hence it was called a "double interdict").  Conceivably, one of the parties knew he was in the wrong and decided he had better obey the praetor's interdict.  If so, that was the end of the matter.  Suppose, however, he chose to brazen it out or, indeed, sincerely believed himself to be in the right.

The next step was to bring matters to a head.  Accordingly, on a prearranged day the parties would commit a symbolic act of violence (vis ex conventu) e.g. pretending to expel each other from the land.  That, for the one in the wrong, must have been a formal disobedience of the praetor's order.  Each party now challenged the other to a wager by which he had to pay his adversary a sum of money if it was he who had disobeyed the interdict (agere per sponsione). The right to interim possession of the land was auctioned to the highest bidder, on his promise to pay his adversary the rent if he turned out to be in the wrong.  The agere per sponsonie was sent off to be tried by a iudex (akin to a one-man jury, usually a prominent citizen), who in due course delivered his decision.

Roman litigation was not for the faint-hearted.  Getting one's opponent into court at all could be difficult, and arguably praetors "were nothing more than politicians, frequently incompetent, open to bribery, and largely insulated against suits for malfeasance".  A litigant could frustrate the interdict process by omitting to take part in its rituals.  When that happened, however, it was possible to obtain a secondary interdict by which he lost the case at once.

Advantages of the interdict
Although the interdict neither conferred nor recognised any proprietary right, the party who prevailed had achieved three important advantages.

First, he enjoyed peaceful possession of the land against his adversary for the time being. Secondly, although his opponent might yet get the land — by bringing a vindicatio — the case had to be proved.  This was important since it assigned the burden of proof.  Thirdly, and in practice, his opponent might not trouble to take it further.  Then, the party left in possession looked very like the real owner.  As time went by it must have become more and more difficult to prove he was not.

In sum, by peaceful, open and non-consensual possession of land a party did not acquire ownership, but he did acquire practical advantages.

The Roman doctrine about establishing possession (not ownership) may seem slightly elusive for those brought up in the Anglophone common law, which "never bothered much with the idea of ownership" and to its lawyers it is trivially obvious that a good title to land can indeed be acquired by mere occupation (e.g. "squatters' rights"). However, it was not so in Roman law which drew a sharp line between ownership and possession.  Except in special cases, mere occupation of land could not confer ownership.

Later knowledge: the text of the edict
Although Gaius' text was imperfectly known to early modern Europeans, because it was lost and not rediscovered until 1816, they knew the edict in the later recension by Justinian.  The interdict's name uti possidetis was a conventional abbreviation of the wording of the praetorial edict:

which has been translated

Uti possidetis as a doctrine for the acquisition of territory in international law
From Roman private law "uti possidetis" was transposed to international law as an assertion of sovereignty over territory, although the analogy was misleading.

European powers, when they sought to justify their acquisition of territory in America and elsewhere, based their claims on a variety of legal concepts.  One argument was that the new lands were terra nullius (belonging to nobody) and so could be acquired by occupation.  But some prominent European jurists and theologians, like Francisco de Vitoria, rejected this, arguing that the lands did have owners: the indigenous peoples.  However, since the European powers were not seeking to justify themselves to the indigenous people, but to their European rivals, all they needed to show was a better claim, not an absolute one.  Here they found the Roman law uti possidetis analogy valuable.

Apparently it was first devised by the Portuguese diplomat Luís da Cunha in order to justify his country's claims to territory in colonial South America, though some have attributed the idea to the Luso-Brazilian diplomat Alexandre de Gusmão.

While Spanish-American states may have been content to draw mutual boundaries by adopting the internal administrative divisions of the old Spanish Empire (see uti possidetis juris, below), this was not done as between Portuguese-America (Brazil) and the Spanish-American polities, and was not possible.  Explained John Bassett Moore:

The Brazilian frontier movement into Spanish-claimed lands
In 1494 Spain and Portugal agreed to "divide" the undiscovered world between them.  The Treaty of Tordesillas prescribed an imaginary line running from pole to pole: Spain was to have the lands to the west of that line, Portugal to the east.  Shortly afterwards, and around the same time, expeditions from both countries "discovered" South America.  As the new continent was explored it was gradually realised that the Tordesillas line, though rather vague, gave Portugal only a corner of it, the vast majority going to Spain.

Despite that, for the next 400 years Portuguese America, and its successor Brazil, expanded relentlessly in a generally westwards direction, deep into the lands claimed by Spain and its successors.  Summarised E. Bradford Burns: Today Brazil comprises about half the continent.

The Portuguese got an early start owing to Spanish acquiescence. Although Portugal and Spain legally were separate kingdoms, the same Spanish dynasty sat on both thrones from 1580 to 1640.  Portuguese settlers ignored the Tordesillas limit, but the Spanish crown did not object to their incursions.  Thus, by mid 17th century — see map (a) — the Portuguese had established incursive footholds around the mouth of the Amazon and along the south Atlantic coast.

There were too few Portuguese men to conquer the vast lands of Brazil by themselves and almost no Portuguese women went there at first.  In effect, sectors of the indigenous people were co-opted.  The country was opened up by bands of entrepreneurs. The most famous of these are the bandeirantes, who searched for wealth: Indians to enslave, gold or diamonds.  Though generally loyal to the Portuguese king, most bandeirantes were mamelucos (of mixed race) or perhaps Indians; illiterate; and extremely poor; speaking Tupi rather than Portuguese amongst themselves.  Some bandeira commanders were black. The wilderness — where they endured severe hardships, and where they hoped to find riches — gripped their imagination.  Bandeirismo in one form or another was to persist into the 19th century.

After the restoration of an independent Portuguese monarchy, the Portuguese interpreted the Tordesillas treaty creatively. Their version would have given them not only Patagonia, the River Plate and Paraguay, but even silver-rich Potosí in Upper Peru. Modern research has revealed that their cartographers deliberately distorted maps to convince the Spanish they occupied more land to the east than was the case.

By 1750, the Luso-Brazilians, employing their "indirect method of conquest" had tripled the extension of Portuguese America beyond that allowed by the Treaty of Tordesillas.

Their indirect method of conquest was to occupy the land with people and apply their version of the Roman doctrine of uti possidetis.  In the Portuguese view this trumped Spanish paper claims — such as, under the Treaty of Tordesillas — because, as time went by, they became obsolete and no longer reflected reality.  Today it might be called facts on the ground.

Portugal articulated its uti possideti principle in the negotiations leading up to the Treaty of Madrid (1750), and this treaty broadly accepted that lands possessed by Portugal should continue to be so. The Treaty of Tordesillas was annulled.

It did not stop continuing Luso-Brazilian expansion.  The Marquis of Pombal, who virtually ruled the Portuguese Empire, instructed: Since there were not enough native Portuguese to populate the frontiers (he wrote), it was essential to abolish "all differences between Indians and Portuguese", to attract the Indians from the Uruguay missions, and encourage their marriage with Europeans.  The Jesuit missions among the Guaraní Indians stood in the way of this plan, and Pombal had the Jesuits expelled from the Portuguese empire in 1759.  In The Undrawn Line: Three Centuries of Strife on the Paraguayan-Mato Grosso Frontier, John Hoyt Williams wrote:

There were subsequent treaties between Portugal and Spain but for various reasons they never succeeded in defining a frontier between their American possessions.  Boundary disputes between their respective successor states had to be resolved by recourse to the factual uti possidetis.

Brazil after it achieved its independence continued with the same principles, demanding that all territorial questions be decided on the principle of uti possidetis de facto. In treaties between Brazil and (respectively) Uruguay (1851), Peru (1852), Venezuela (1852), Paraguay (1856), the Argentine Confederation (1857), and Bolivia (1867), the uti possidetis de facto principle was adopted.

Africa
A similar principle, called the principle of effective occupation, was adopted by European powers e.g. at the Berlin Conference (1884-5).  It was followed by the Scramble for Africa.

Peace treaties

Classical international law
When two states had been at war, the ensuing peace treaty was interpreted to mean that each party got a permanent right to the territory it occupied at the conclusion of hostilities, unless the contrary was expressly stipulated.  Probably the most influential 19th century textbook, Henry Wheaton's Elements of International Law, asserted (in text virtually unchanged through successive editions for 80 years): 

This was only a default rule, however, for usually states were careful to specify explicitly in the peace treaty.

Sometimes a war would cease without a peace treaty.  (For example, in the Spanish American wars of independence the fighting stopped in 1825, but Spain did not formally recognise the new republics' independence for a generation.)  In such cases it was doubtful whether the losing side was deemed (1) to assert the status quo ante bellum or (2) to concede the uti possidetis, but most authors favoured the latter alternative.

Current position
The classical doctrine that victory in war gave good title to conquered territory was modified in the 20th century.  The League of Nations Covenant of 1919, while it required states to resort to conflict resolution, did permit recourse to war.  However the 1928 Kellog-Briand Pact, ratified by most of the world's independent states, banned aggressive war; it was the basis on which the World War II war criminals were prosecuted in the Nuremberg and Tokyo Trials.  Its essentials were reproduced in the United Nations Charter (1945).  By Article 2(4):although Article 51 does allow self-defence.

A corollary is said to be that international law does not recognise forcible territorial acquisitions, and a treaty procured by force or the threat of force is void; in other words, the uti possidetis interpretation of peace treaties is now obsolete.  However, the position of a state which fights in self-defence and recovers territory previously lost to the aggessor does not appear to have been discussed.

Uti possidetis juris

This is a method of establishing international boundaries based on anterior legal divisions.  "Stated simply, uti possidetis provides that states emerging from decolonization shall presumptively inherit the colonial administrative borders that they held at the time of independence".  The new states may be able to modify the old borders by mutual agreement with their neighbours.

Originating after the breakup of the Spanish empire in America, it was there assumed to be possible "by a careful study of Spanish decrees, to trace a definite line of division between the colonial administrative units as of the period of independence".  Hence the new states, when settling their mutual boundaries, quite often instructed arbitrators to use the uti possidetis at the date of independence.  In reality, it turned out that a definite historical line could rarely be found.  Later, the principle was extended to the newly independent African states, and it has been applied to the dissolution of Yugoslavia and the Soviet Union.

The doctrine of uti possidetis juris has been criticised as colliding with the principle of self-determination. Castellino and Allen have argued that many of the modern separatist conflicts or tribal conflicts, such as Biafra, East Timor, Katanga, Kosovo, and Rwanda, can be traced to blind insistence on such artificial borders.

References and notes

Sources

History of Brazil
History of South America
International law
Latin legal terminology
Roman law
Territorial evolution
Treaties